Trần Quốc Hoàn (23 January 1916 – 5 September 1986) was the first Minister of Public Security of North Vietnam and the longest serving. He served in that role from 1952 through unification to 1981. He laid the foundation for structure of Vietnam's security services. He was a member of the Polit Buro from 1972 until 1980.

Early life
He was born as Nguyễn Trọng Cảnh on 23 January 1916, in Nam Trung village, Nam Đàn District, Nghệ An Province. He participated in the 1930 uprising, and joined the Indochina Communist party in March 1934. During the late 1930s he was involved with the student movement in Huế and Hanoi, as well as various youth organizations. He joined the Indochina Democratic Front (Mặt trận Thống nhất Dân chủ Đông Dương) and was Secretary of the Committee (1937–1939). In May 1940, he was arrested and sent to the prison at Sơn La. Released in May 1945, he continued his revolutionary activities, becoming Party Secretary for Tonkin. In 1951 he was elected to the Party Central Committee and made Deputy Minister of police. On 2 May 1952 he became Director General of Public Security of Vietnam, and the following year the agency's name was changed to Ministry of Security (Bộ Công an) with Trần Quốc Hoàn at its head.

Minister of Security
Trần was known as the Beria of Vietnam, in reference to Lavrentiy Beria, Joseph Stalin's notorious secret police chief.

Honors
A street in the Cầu Giấy District of Hanoi is named after Trần Quốc Hoàn.

Notes

Alternates of the 3rd Politburo of the Workers' Party of Vietnam
Members of the 3rd Politburo of the Workers' Party of Vietnam
Members of the 4th Secretariat of the Communist Party of Vietnam
Members of the 2nd Central Committee of the Workers' Party of Vietnam
Members of the 3rd Central Committee of the Workers' Party of Vietnam
Members of the 4th Central Committee of the Communist Party of Vietnam
Members of the 5th Central Committee of the Communist Party of Vietnam
1916 births
1986 deaths